This article surveys the postage stamps and postal history of the Republic of South Moluccas. Historical or political incidents can be found in the main article.

Stamp issues
Although the Republic of South Moluccas did not issue its own postage stamps, several stamps bearing the country's name can be found. They are so-called bogus stamps, which are private stamp issues and were not issued by any postal administration of the South Moluccas.

There are three distinct bogus stamp issues of the Republic of South Moluccas:
Overprints
Stamp issues of the exile government in the Netherlands
Stamps from the Österreichische Staatsdruckerei (Austrian National Print Office), which were ordered and sold by New York stamp dealer Henry Stolow.

Overprints
In 1950, 17 stamps of the Dutch East Indies and Indonesia were overprinted with "Republik Maluku Selatan". Many philatelists believe that the stamps could have been used locally. However, the majority assumes that they are stamp forgeries.

Stamp issues of the exile government in the Netherlands
Several one- and three-coloured stamp issues of South Moluccas lacking the date of issue are known. They were possibly sold by the exiled government in the Netherlands. These issues were supposed to announce the archipelago and flag of the Republic of South Moluccas, point out the concern of this exile government, and win target audiences, such as the Universal Postal Union (UPU), the United Nations (UN), and General Douglas MacArthur for their goals. But there are also stamps where no unambiguous reason can be given for their issuance.

Stamps ordered and sold by Henry Stolow
In 1955, approximately 150 coloured triangular or rectangular stamp forgeries by New York and Munich stamp dealer Henry Stolow (1901–1971) appeared on the market without a date of issue. These stamp issues were printed in the Österreichische Staatsdruckerei without verification of their legality. These issues do not bear any hint of their date of issue, as German stamps do, for example. Therefore, it is completely futile to assign them to specific years of issue, as is sometimes done. They were never used for postage, so there are only mint copies.

In 1991, Peter Doerling wrote:

Valuation of these stamp issues
Respected stamp catalogs and stamp dealers do not sell stamps from the Republic Maluku Selatan. No valid stamps from that region are known to the Michel editorial department.

Regarding the coloured stamp issues sold since 1955, the Michel editorial department stated:

Ulrich Häger wrote in the "Großes Lexikon der Philatelie" (Great Encyclopaedia of Philately) under the keyword Maluku Selatan:

The Scott Standard Postage Stamp Catalogue wrote under the keyword South Moluccas:

References

Literature
in German
Ulrich Häger: Großes Lexikon der Philatelie, Bertelsmann Lexikon-Verlag, Gütersloh-Berlin-Munich-Vienna 1973 (p. 275 Maluku Selatan,  p. 449 Henry Stolow).
Michel Rundschau 5/1988 (p. 362 Maluku Selatan),  7/1988 (p. 534–536 Maluku Selatan).

External links
 English articles about the overprints, which assume local use of the stamps:
 Article South Moluccas (1950) at linns.com 
 Article South Moluccas (Republik Maluku Selatan) at Sandafayre Online
 English articles about the stamp issues of the exile government in the Netherlands:
 World History at KMLA 
 Overview of the stamp issues of the exile government
Images:
 Examples of the stamp issues of the exile government in the Netherlands:
 Archipelago and flag, UPU, United Nations, General Douglas MacArthur
 Examples of the stamps ordered and sold by Henry Stolow:
 fruit bats, kingfisher,  Belamcanda chinensis,  Rhoeo discolor

Former governments in exile
Cinderella stamps
Philately of Indonesia